This following is a list of public holidays in Tajikistan:

Holidays

Military/Paramilitary 
August 4 – Paratroopers' Day, celebrates Tajik Mobile Forces
February 6 – Day of the Tajik Police, celebrates Tajik Internal Troops 
May 28 – Border Guards Day, celebrates Tajik Border Troops
October 2 – National Guard Day, celebrates Presidential National Guard

See also 
 Culture of Tajikistan

References 

 
Tajikistani culture
Tajikistan
Events in Tajikistan
Holidays